Milk crates are square or rectangular interlocking boxes  that are used to transport milk and other products from dairies to retail establishments.

In English-speaking parts of Europe the term "bottle crate" is more common but in the United States the term "milk crate" is applied even when the transported beverage is not milk.

History 
The dimensions of the milk crate may have been influenced by the dimensions of the tea chest. For all practical purposes, both hold similar internal volumes, but tea chests are designed for shipping over the open ocean.

The bottle crate emerged after the tea chest was a de facto shipping method.  The plastic milk crate is claimed as an Australian invention, produced through a period of trial and error in design by the Dairy Farmers Cooperative Milk Company in the 1950s and 60s.

Design 
Middle 20th century bottle crates were made of wood, later ones were stainless steel, and those made in the latter part of the century were of heavy-duty polyethylene.

The most common milk crate sizes are designed to carry several  milk jugs:

Uses and recycling 

Milk crates are often stolen for either personal or business use or for the plastic that they are made out of. Theft of milk crates can cost dairies millions of US dollars per year.

This has led at least one dairy farm to hire a private investigator to discover what is happening to the crates; the results of investigations point to plastic re-sellers being the culprits in the majority of thefts.

Starting around the 1970s, some plastic manufacturers began marketing milk crate types of storage containers to consumers for use in personal storage or decor. These products competed with higher-end proprietary modular plastic storage cube systems, such as the Finnish "Palaset" line marketed  by Design Research; the consumer-grade storage crates varied widely in price, quality, and sturdiness compared to their commercial counterparts. The basic milk crate stackable design was often modified to also allow stacking with the openings facing sideways rather than upwards, thus creating a bookshelf-like set of storage compartments. Similar products remain on the market in the 21st century.

Alternate shipping methods 
In July 2008, Wal-Mart and some other stores introduced a square milk jug that does not need to be transported in a crate. Sometimes called "green" milk jugs, they are not green in color, but rather are claimed to be environmentally friendly.

These new milk jugs are stackable up to a specified maximum height, and can be transported without crates. Companies need not buy plastic for shipping crates, or to transport or wash them.

See also
 Banana box, a type of cardboard box designed for transportation of bananas
 Crate
 Euro container, a similarly-sized standardized container
 Milk crate challenge
 Reusable packaging
 Tea chest

References

Dairy farming
Crate
Shipping containers
Articles containing video clips